The Rumson School District is a community public school district that serves students in pre-kindergarten through eighth grade from the Borough of Rumson, in Monmouth County, New Jersey, United States.

As of the 2018–19 school year, the district, comprising two schools, had an enrollment of 999 students and 96.5 classroom teachers (on an FTE basis), for a student–teacher ratio of 10.4:1.

The district is classified by the New Jersey Department of Education as being in District Factor Group "J", the highest of eight groupings. District Factor Groups organize districts statewide to allow comparison by common socioeconomic characteristics of the local districts. From lowest socioeconomic status to highest, the categories are A, B, CD, DE, FG, GH, I and J.

Public school students in ninth through twelfth grades attend Rumson-Fair Haven Regional High School, a regional, four-year comprehensive public high school serving students from both Fair Haven and Rumson, where the school is located. As of the 2018–19 school year, the high school had an enrollment of 983 students and 84.8 classroom teachers (on an FTE basis), for a student–teacher ratio of 11.6:1.

Awards and recognition
For the 2001-02 school year, Forrestdale Middle School was recognized with the Blue Ribbon Award from the United States Department of Education, the highest honor that an American school can achieve.

Schools
Schools in the district (with 2018–19 enrollment data from the National Center for Education Statistics) are:
Deane-Porter Elementary School with 385 students in grades PreK-3
Shari Feeney, Principal
Forrestdale Middle School with 608 students in grade 4-8
Jennifer Gibbons, Principal

Administrators
Core members of the district's administration are:
Dr. John E. Bormann, Superintendent
Debra Allen, Business Administrator / Board Secretary

Board of education
The district's board of education, with nine members, sets policy and oversees the fiscal and educational operation of the district through its administration. As a Type II school district, the board's trustees are elected directly by voters to serve three-year terms of office on a staggered basis, with three seats up for election each year held (since 2012) as part of the November general election.

References

External links
Rumson School District
 
School Data for the Rumson School District, National Center for Education Statistics
 

Rumson, New Jersey
New Jersey District Factor Group J
School districts in Monmouth County, New Jersey